WA Wildlife, operated by Native ARC Inc, is a wildlife rescue, treatment and rehabilitation facility in the Beeliar Wetlands near Bibra Lake, Western Australia and was the first wildlife rehabilitation facility to be licensed as a veterinary hospital by the Veterinary Surgeons' Board of Western Australia in 2018. It has a purpose built hospital (known as the WA Wildlife Hospital) to care for the animals, with intensive care unit facilities to care for animals that would have previously been euthanised. The hospital provides treatment to more than 4000 sick and injured native animals each year. Facilities include a triage room, treatment room, consultation room, laboratory, surgery, radiology, ICU, seabird, mammal and reptile wards, isolation ward with decontamination chamber and a stand-alone necropsy suite. WA Wildlife is part of group of organisations helping to protect the nests of the snake-necked turtles that breed around Bibra Lake. In 2020 it was estimated that 25 of the hatchlings were able to make it to the safety of the lake. Native Arc Inc is a registered charity, number 21503, licensed under the Charitable Collections Act 1946.

History
WA Wildlife was originally formed as Native ARC (referring to the Native Animal Rehabilitation Centre); it was established in 1998 to care for, rehabilitate, and ultimately return injured wildlife to where they were found. In April 2021, WA Wildlife commenced operating the WA Wildlife Hospital, which was funded by a AUD6 million grant from the City of Cockburn, as part of the upgrade of the Hope Road precinct, which includes The Wetlands Centre and the Bibra Lake Scout Group facilities.

WA Wildlife Hospital
The WA Wildlife Hospital, in Perth's southern suburbs, is Australia's first holistic trauma hospital for native wildlife, admitting up to 50 animals a day. It provides specialist emergency procedures for injured animals and rehabilitates them for release. In 2021, the Hospital admitted more than 5,500 sick and injured animals with 40 per cent of patients released back into the wild. For more than two decades, WA Wildlife worked out of a tiny old cottage on site, previously trading as Native ARC from 1998 until 2021. The current Bibra Lake Hospital was funded by the City of Cockburn and Lotterywest, and at almost 700 square metres, it is one of the largest wildlife hospitals in Australia. The Hospital is a state-of-the-art facility with a specially designed surgery, radiology, treatment room, laboratory, isolation ward, species specific recovery wards and on-site rehabilitation facilities including a large kitchen, laundry and pre-release flight/exercise enclosures. The Hospital receives no government funding and relies on donations from the public to support operating costs.

WA Wildlife Ambulance - Mobile rescue service
In February 2021 WA Wildlife established the WA Wildlife Ambulance, which was the first full time wildlife rescue service in Western Australia. It operates every day of the year and will rescue any injured wildlife native to Western Australia. The WA Wildlife ambulance is the only rescue service in Western Australia that has paid wildlife rescuers (funded by the Society for the Prevention of Cruelty to Animals International), specifically trained to deal with a range of wildlife species.The Ambulance routinely rescues sick and injured adult kangaroos using both trained wildlife rescuers and veterinary staff.

Educational programs
WA Wildlife has several animals who, due to their injuries, are unable to be returned to the wild. They remain in residence at WA Wildlife, and some of them are used as part of the education programs that focus on supporting, protecting and conserving wildlife and their habitats.

References

External links
 
 WA Wildlife video for GLAM-Wiki, as part of Wikimania 2021

Charities based in Australia
Beeliar Regional Park
Wildlife rehabilitation and conservation centers
Veterinary hospitals
2021 establishments in Australia
Veterinary medicine in Australia